Knight Bachelor is the oldest and lowest-ranking form of knighthood in the British honours system; it is the rank granted to a man who has been knighted by the monarch but not inducted as a member of one of the organised orders of chivalry. Women are not knighted; in practice, the equivalent award for a woman is appointment as Dame Commander of the Order of the British Empire (founded in 1917).

Knights Bachelor appointed in 1907

Notes 
It was announced in the 1907 Birthday Honours that a knighthood was to be bestowed on Alfred Billson (the serving MP for North West Staffordshire), but he died before he received the accolade. On 19 August 1907, Edward VII declared that his widow, Lilla Billson, "shall have, hold and enjoy the style, title, place and precedence to which she would have been entitled had her husband survived to receive the honour of Knight Bachelor at the hands of His Majesty".

References 

Knights Bachelor
Lists of knights and dames
British honours system